Sonbain or Sonbain Ashapati or Sonabain Glacier is a mountain massif in the  Himalayas of Jammu and Kashmir, India, east of the town of Bhaderwah and near the border with Himachal Pradesh. The Sonabain glacier originates Neeru river. This Mountain is the border between J&K (Bhaderwah) and Himachal pradesh (Chamba).

Etymology
The Sonbain word is derived from two Kashmiri words, Son means Golden and Bain means Spring.

Geography
On the Bhaderwah-Bani-Basholi road, Gurdanda is a large ridge. The Sonbain glacier, which gives birth to the Neeru river, is located to its left.

References

Doda district